Giacomo De Maria (1762–1838) was an Italian sculptor, active in Bologna.

Biography
He was a pupil of Domenico Piò. Among his works are:
Putti of the chapel after the crossing of San Petronio
Statues in the atrium of the Palazzo Hercolani, Bologna
Bust of Angelo Venturoli for his college
Statues in the fifth chapel of San Giorgio
Bas-relief of Olympus for tympanum of the facade of Palazzo Aldini, Bologna
Charity in the Monumental Arch of the Lupari family at the Certosa of Bologna 
Sculpture of the Conventi, Ranuzzi, Cospi, Capra tomb monuments (latter has a "veiled eternity")

References

1762 births
1838 deaths
18th-century Italian sculptors
19th-century Italian sculptors
Italian male sculptors
Artists from Bologna
19th-century Italian male artists
18th-century Italian male artists